Pick Szeged is a Hungarian company that produces a variety of meat products, most notably Winter salami. It was founded in 1869, and remains based in Szeged, Hungary.

The company sponsors the Hungarian handball team SC Pick Szeged.

Winter salami of Szeged

Winter salami (Pick Salami) is a traditional product made of a mixture of lean pork and fatty pork belly, and spiced according to a secret recipe. The mixture is filled in casings, followed by a cold smoking curing, a drying and a ripening phase. Finally the salami becomes covered with noble mold.

Szeged

Szeged lies on the banks of the Tisza river. The natural endowments of Szeged and its region are favourable to cultivation of plants and animal husbandry. The geographical conditions and related expertise allows for the breeding of high quality pigs. The mature pigs, which are used to make salami in Szeged, come from these areas.

History

About the factory 
The production of winter salami was introduced to Hungary by Mark Pick, a master butcher of Jewish origin. In 1869 Mr. Pick settled down and established a salami factory in Szeged, Hungary. He developed and improved his business step by step. He made salami in larger quantities when he brought in workers from Italy in 1883. The large-scale production of salami was started in 1885. After the founder’s death in 1892, his widow and her brother managed the operation.
Mark's eldest son Jenő joined the enterprise in 1906. With him, a new period in the factory’s history began. He bought the nearby ‘Tian’ salami factory, which had become earlier bankrupt. This way the entire real estate near the Tisza river became the property of Pick family. Jenő Pick aspired to introduce changes with the help of modern tools. He recognised the significance of advertisement and had talent for business. Salami became the main product of the enterprise in the first decades of the 20th century. Between the two world wars, Pick factory became the most significant plant of the Hungarian food industry and the Pick salami became a global brand. Jenő Pick ran the factory on his own from 1934 until its nationalization.

About salami 

According to the original recipe, winter salami was made of donkey meat. After a while, however, there were not enough donkeys left to slaughter in Hungary. Because of this a new solution had to be found and donkey meat was replaced with elder sow meat, which has a similar taste.

One of the main characteristics of Pick Salami is that a coat of mould appears during drying and maturation. Mold fungi need a chilly temperature and a suitable humidity to settle down. Therefore, the factories were established at riversides, such as the original Pick Salami factory at the Tisza river.

First-class work is not possible without technological modernization. With the introduction of cooling technology at the end of the 1950s, a long shelf life could be guaranteed. After this the winter salami preserved its seasonal character only in name.

The local features give significant qualities, harmonic smells and unique taste to the Pick salami. Nowadays the winter salami of Szeged has become known world-wide. It is due to original basic material, traditional technology, weather condition, presence of mould fungi and preserved knowledge.

References

External links
 Pick Szeged
 Pick Museum
 see www.360cities.net/image/szeged-jewish-cemetery-pick-marks-tomb#0.00,0.00,70.0 for Mark Pick's tombstone

Food and drink companies of Hungary
Hungarian brands
Sausage companies
Meat companies
1869 establishments in Hungary
Organisations based in Szeged